Kampung Teriso, Saribas (also known as Kampung Triso Darat or Kampung Triso) is a coastal settlement in Sarawak, Malaysia. Neighbouring settlements include:

References

Populated places in Sarawak